Nico (Cicero) Torteli (born February 16, 1967 in Rio de Janeiro) is a former breaststroke swimmer from Brazil.

Cícero Torteli started swimming at Fluminense, and in 1982 he was champion of Gimnasíade, in the 4x100 meters medley relay, along with Ricardo Prado, Luciano Meira and Paulo Batisti.

In 1985, he was runner-up in South American youth in the 100 meters breaststroke and, that same year, he transferred to Flamengo.

Participated at the 1986 World Aquatics Championships in Madrid, where he finished 16th in the 100-metre breaststroke consolation final, and 25th in the 200-metre breaststroke.

He was at the 1987 Pan American Games, in Indianapolis, where he won a bronze medal in the 4×100-metre medley.  He also finished 6th in the 100-metre breaststroke, and in the 200-metre breaststroke. 

At the 1988 Summer Olympics, in Seoul, he finished 18th in the 4×100-metre medley, 37th in the 100-metre breaststroke, and 44th in the 200-metre breaststroke. 

After retiring from professional swimming, turned entrepreneur. He opened a company called Paggo, and implemented the system for paying bills of the giant Brazilian mobile phone operator Oi, known as Oi Paggo. After the brand Paggo was bought by Oi for R$ 75 million, Torteli took his company Freeddom (new Paggo's name) to Nigeria, seen by him as a place to expand the company's operations, what the market calls for mobile banking.

Currently resides in São Paulo.

References

1967 births
Living people
Brazilian male breaststroke swimmers
Swimmers at the 1987 Pan American Games
Swimmers at the 1988 Summer Olympics
Olympic swimmers of Brazil
Swimmers from Rio de Janeiro (city)
Pan American Games bronze medalists for Brazil
Pan American Games medalists in swimming
Medalists at the 1987 Pan American Games
20th-century Brazilian people